The ochre-striped antpitta (Grallaria dignissima) is a species of bird in the family Grallariidae. It is found in Ecuador, Peru and southern Colombia.

Its natural habitat is subtropical or tropical moist lowland forest.

Described in the 1880 edition of The Proceedings of the Zoological Society, London. Illustrated by John Gerrard Keulemans as Plate 17.

References

ochre-striped antpitta
Birds of the Ecuadorian Amazon
Birds of the Peruvian Amazon
ochre-striped antpitta
ochre-striped antpitta
ochre-striped antpitta
Taxonomy articles created by Polbot